The 1991 Central and Western District Board election was held on 3 March 1991 to elect all 13 elected to the 19-member Central and Western District Board.

Overall election results
Before election:

Change in composition:

Results by constituency

Chung Wan

Kennedy Town East

Kennedy Town West and Mount Davis

Middle Levels East

Middle Levels West

Sai Ying Pun East

Sai Ying Pun West

Sheung Wan

References

1991 Hong Kong local elections
Central and Western District Council elections